Neoamphion vittatus is a species of beetle in the family Cerambycidae. It was described by Reiche in 1839.

References

Agapanthiini
Beetles described in 1839